Michael P. Bell (born 1955) is a former Mayor of Toledo, Ohio who took office on January 4, 2010 and served until January 4, 2014. Bell previously served as Toledo Fire Chief and State Fire Marshal.

Early career
His career in Public Service began in 1980 when he joined the Toledo Department of Fire and Rescue as a firefighter and later became a certified paramedic/EMT. In 1990, he was appointed as Chief of the Toledo Fire and Rescue Department, the first African American as well as the youngest person ever to lead the department. He remained in that position for over 16 years. Under his leadership the TFD earned the prestigious honor of Accreditation by the Commission on Fire Accreditation, a certification held by only the most elite fire departments. He is a member of the International Fire Chief's Association and received the President's Award for his efforts for diversification.

State Fire Marshal
In 2007, he was appointed as State Fire Marshal by Ohio Governor Ted Strickland. In that position he implemented the "Everyone Goes Home" program, stressing firefighter safety. That program earned the Seal of Excellence Award from the Firefighter Life Safety Initiatives Program.

Mayor of Toledo

In 2009, Bell ran as an independent in Toledo's mayoral election. He ran against attorney Keith Wilkowski, a Democrat. Bell defeated Wilkowski on the November 3 election by a margin of only 2% and was sworn in on January 4, 2010. He was the second African-American mayor in the city's history.

In 2013, Bell again ran for mayor, however, his opponent, Councilman D. Michael Collins, won the mayor's race by a margin of 56.5% to 43.5%.

The unofficial vote was 28,002 for Mr. Collins and 21,535 for Mr. Bell. Turnout was 25.4 percent of registered voters in the city.

Bell officially ended his term as Mayor of Toledo on January 4, 2014.

References

Living people
American fire chiefs
African-American mayors in Ohio
Mayors of Toledo, Ohio
Ohio Independents
Toledo Rockets football players
1955 births
21st-century African-American people
20th-century African-American people